Wrightia antidysenterica, the coral swirl or tellicherry bark, is a flowering plant in the genus Wrightia. Wrightia antidysenterica is sometimes confused with the species Holarrhena pubescens due to a second, taxonomically invalid publication of the name Holarrhena pubescens.

Construction
The juice of this plant is a potent ingredient for a mixture of wall plaster, according to the Samarāṅgaṇa Sūtradhāra, which is a Sanskrit treatise dealing with Śilpaśāstra (Hindu science of art and construction).

References 

antidysenterica
Flora of Nepal
Flora of Thailand